Quercus jinpinensis is an uncommon Asian species of trees in the beech family Fagaceae. It is native to southern China, found only in the Province of Yunnan. It is placed in subgenus Cerris, section Cyclobalanopsis.

Quercus jinpinensis is a tree. The leaves can be as much as 11 cm long.

References

External links
line drawing, Flora of China Illustrations vol. 4, fig. 380, drawings 10-12 at upper left

jinpinensis
Endemic flora of Yunnan
Trees of China
Plants described in 1976